The following lists events that happened during 1910 in Chile.

Incumbents
President of Chile: Pedro Montt Montt (until 16 August), Elías Fernández Albano (until 6 September), Emiliano Figueroa Larraín (until 23 December), Ramón Barros Luco

Events 
15 October – Chilean presidential election, 1910

Births
22 February – Stewart Iglehart (d. 1993)

Deaths 
24 June – Juan Williams Rebolledo (b. 1825)
16 August – Pedro Montt Montt (b. 1846)
6 September – Elías Fernández Albano (b. 1845)

References 

 
Years of the 20th century in Chile
Chile